In Belarus, there are both privately held and state-owned newspapers.

Below is a list of newspapers published in Belarus.  These newspapers are published in Minsk, unless otherwise noted.

Belarusian language
Zviazda (Звязда, 40,000 copies) , the largest state-controlled Belarusian language newspaper.
Novy Chas (Новы Час, 7,000 copies) 
Nasha Slova (Наша Слова, 7,000 copies), newspaper about culture and history, published by the Francishak Skaryna Belarusian Language Society
Naša Niva (Наша Ніва; 6,000 copies) , the oldest Belarusian weekly newspaper founded in 1906 and revived in 1991, pro-opposition
Holas Radzimy (Голас радзiмы, 2,000 copies) , government-controlled newspaper for the Belarusian diaspora
Narodnya Naviny Vitsebska (Народныя навіны Віцебска)  - online newspaper from  Vitsebsk
Pahonia (Пагоня)  - pro-opposition newspaper formerly published in Hrodna. In 2001 closed down by the government, since then on-line

Russian language
Brestskaya Gazeta (Брестская газета) 
Sovetskaya Belorussia (Советская Белоруссия; about 400,000 copies) , the largest national newspaper, official newspaper of the Administration of the President of Belarus
Vo Slavu Rodiny (Во славу Родины; 32,300 copies) , official newspaper of the Belarusian Ministry of Defense
Narodnaya Gazeta (Народная Газета, 25,042 copies) , official newspaper of the Parliament of Belarus
BelGazeta (БелГазета, 21,200 copies) , independent national newspaper on business and politics
Belorusy i rynok (Белорусы и Рынок, 12,000 copies) , weekly independent business newspaper
7 Dney (7 дней; Seven Days)  
Belorusskaya Delovaya Gazeta (БДГ; BDG) , formerly the largest independent newspaper on politics and business in 1990s (with about 70,000 copies), closed down by officials in 2006
Belaruski Chas (Беларускi час) 
Belorusskaya Lesnaya Gazeta (Белорусская лесная газета; 23,000 copies) , a specialized professional newspaper on forestry
Bobruyskiy Kurier (Бобруйский курьер)  - published in Bobruysk
Brestskiy Kurier (Брестский курьер)  - published in Brest
Gomelskaya Pravda (Гомельская правда)  - published in Gomel
Infa-Kurjer (Iнфа-Кур'ер)  - published in Slutsk
Dnyaprovets (Дняпровец)  - published in Rechitsa
Meditsinskiy Vestnik (Медицинский вестник) 
Minsk na Ladonyah (Минск на Ладонях; Minsk on the Palms) 
Minskiy Kurier (Минский Курьер) 
Muzykalnaya Gazeta (Музыкальная газета; Music Newspaper) 
Nedvizhimost Belorussii (Недвижимость Белоруссии; Real Estate of Belarus) 
Respublikanskaya Stroitel'naya Gazeta (Республиканская строительная газета; Republic Construction Newspaper) 
Vecherniy Grodno (Вечерний Гродно)  - published in Grodno
Vecherniy Minsk (Вечерний Минск; Evening Minsk) 
Vitebskiy Kurier (Витебский Курьер)  - published in Vitebsk
Zheleznodorozhnik Belorussii (Железнодорожник Белоруссии; Railroad Worker of Belarus)

Bilingual newspapers
Narodnaja Volia (Народная воля, 15,000 copies), the largest national pro-opposition newspaper on politics 
 Hazeta Slonimskaya (Газета Слонімская; Газета Слонимская; 7,000 to 8,000 copies) , an independent local newspaper published in Slonim
Intex-Press (Интекс-пресс, 17,300 copies) , an independent local newspaper published in Baranavichy
Zhodzinskiya Naviny (Жодзінскія Навіны; Zhodino News)  - published in Zhodzina
Vecherniy Brest (Вечерний Брест; Evening Brest)  - published in Brest

See also
Media of Belarus
List of newspapers

References

Newspapers published in Belarus
Belarus
Newspapers